Clandeboye Park, known for commercial reasons as the Bangor Fuels Arena, is a football stadium in Bangor, Northern Ireland. It is the home ground of Bangor and Ards.

At one time, the pitch was the smallest in the Irish league, but it no longer holds this distinction since the pitch was enlarged after the stock-car racing track was removed in the later years of the twentieth century.

External links
Bangor Football Club – Gallery Irish Football Club Project
Bangor Ground Hopper

Association football venues in Northern Ireland
Bangor, County Down
Association football venues in County Down
Ards F.C.
Bangor F.C.